Momentum was the first film shot and released in the IMAX HD film format, which ran at 48 frames per second, and was also one of the first films to use Ambisonic surround sound. The film was produced for the Canada pavilion at Seville Expo '92 by National Film Board of Canada, by the same creative team that made the 1986 3D IMAX film Transitions for Expo 86. The film takes viewers across Canada, demonstrating the ability of the 48 frame/s process to portray motion on the giant IMAX screen with reduced strobing.

References

External links
 
 

1992 short films
Films without speech
National Film Board of Canada documentaries
IMAX short films
IMAX documentary films
Films directed by Colin Low (filmmaker)
Films directed by Tony Ianzelo
World's fair films
1992 documentary films
1992 films
Seville Expo '92
Canadian short documentary films
Films scored by Eldon Rathburn
National Film Board of Canada short films
1990s Canadian films